The 1971 Prize of Moscow News was the sixth edition of an international figure skating competition organized in Moscow, Soviet Union. It was held November 25–28, 1971. Medals were awarded in the disciplines of men's singles, ladies' singles, pair skating and ice dancing. Soviets swept the men's podium, led by Sergei Chetverukhin. The ladies' category was won by Marina Titova, who took the title for the second consecutive year. Olympic champions Ludmila Belousova / Oleg Protopopov won the pairs' title, defeating two pairs who had beaten them a year earlier. World champions Lyudmila Pakhomova / Alexander Gorshkov took gold in the ice dancing event for the third consecutive year.

Men

Ladies

Pairs

Ice dancing

References

Prize of Moscow News
1971 in Soviet sport
1971 in figure skating